The prehistory of Australia is the period between the first human habitation of the Australian continent and the colonisation of Australia in 1788, which marks the start of consistent written documentation of Australia. This period has been variously estimated, with most evidence suggesting that it goes back between 50,000 and 65,000 years. This era is referred as prehistory rather than history because knowledge of this time period does not derive from written documentation. However, some argue that Indigenous oral tradition should be accorded an equal status. 

A hunter-gatherer lifestyle was dominant until the arrival of Europeans, although there is evidence of land management by practices such as cultural burning, and in some areas, agriculture, fish farming, and permanent settlements.

Arrival 

The earliest evidence of humans in Australia has been variously estimated, with most agreement  that it dates from between 50,000 and 65,000 years BP.

There is considerable discussion among archaeologists as to the route taken by the first migrants to Australia, widely taken to be ancestors of the modern Aboriginal peoples. Migration took place during the closing stages of the Pleistocene, when sea levels were much lower than they are today. Repeated episodes of extended glaciation during the Pleistocene epoch resulted in decreases of sea levels by more than 100 metres in Australasia. People appear to have arrived by sea during a period of glaciation, when New Guinea and Tasmania were joined to the continent of Australia. The continental coastline extended much further out into the Timor Sea, and Australia and New Guinea formed a single landmass (known as Sahul), connected by an extensive land bridge across the Arafura Sea, Gulf of Carpentaria and Torres Strait. Nevertheless, the sea still presented a major obstacle so it is theorised that these ancestral people reached Australia by island hopping. Two routes have been proposed. One follows an island chain between Sulawesi and New Guinea and the other reaches North Western Australia via Timor. Rupert Gerritsen has suggested an alternative theory, involving accidental colonisation as a result of tsunamis. The journey still required sea travel however, making them some of the world's earliest mariners.

In the 2013 book First Footprints: The Epic Story of the First Australians, Scott Cane writes that the first wave may have been prompted by the eruption of Toba, and if they arrived around 70,000 years ago, they could have crossed the water from Timor, when the sea level was low – but if they came later, around 50,000 years ago, a more likely route would be through the Moluccas to New Guinea. Given that the likely landfall regions have been under around 50 metres of water for the last 15,000 years, it is unlikely that the timing will ever be established with certainty.

Dating of sites 
The minimum widely accepted time frame for the arrival of humans in Australia is placed at least 48,000 years ago. Many sites dating from this time period have been excavated. In Arnhem Land Madjedbebe (formerly known as Malakunanja II) fossils and a rock shelter have been dated to around 65,000 years old. According to mitochondrial DNA research, Aboriginal people reached Eyre Peninsula (South Australia) 49,000-45,000 years ago from both the east (clockwise, along the coast, from northern Australia) and the west (anti-clockwise). 

Radiocarbon dating suggests that they lived in and around Sydney for at least 30,000 years. In an archaeological dig in Parramatta, Western Sydney, it was found that some Aboriginal peoples used charcoal, stone tools and possible ancient campfires. Near Penrith, a far western suburb of Sydney, numerous Aboriginal stone tools were found in Cranebrook Terraces gravel sediments having dates of 45,000 to 50,000 years BP. This would mean that there was human settlement in Sydney earlier than thought.

Archaeological evidence indicates human habitation at the upper Swan River, Western Australia by about 40,000 years ago. in 1999 Charles Dortch identified chert and calcrete flake stone tools, found at Rottnest Island in Western Australia, as possibly dating to at least 70,000 years ago. This seems to tie in accurately with U/Th and 14C results of a flint tool found embedded in Tamala limestone (Aminozone C) as well as both mtDNA and Y chromosome studies on the genetic distance of Australian Aboriginal genomes from African and other Eurasian ones. A 2018 study using archaeobotany dated evidence of human habitation at Karnatukul (Serpent's Glen) in the Carnarvon Range in the Little Sandy Desert in WA at around 50,000 years (20,000 years earlier than previously thought), and it was shown that human habitation had been continuous at the site since then. 

Tasmania, which was connected to the continent by a land bridge, was inhabited at least 30,000 years ago. Others have claimed that some sites are up to 60,000 years old, but these claims are not universally accepted. Palynological evidence from South Eastern Australia suggests an increase in fire activity dating from around 120,000 years ago. This has been interpreted as representing human activity, but the dating of the evidence has been strongly challenged.

Migration routes and waves 
A 2021 study by researchers at the Australian Research Council Centre of Excellence for Australian Biodiversity and Heritage has mapped the likely migration routes of the peoples as they moved across the Australian continent to its southern reaches of what is now Tasmania, but back then part of the mainland. The modelling is based on data from archaeologists, anthropologists, ecologists, geneticists, climatologists, geomorphologists, and hydrologists, and it is intended to compare the modelling with the oral histories of Aboriginal peoples, including Dreaming stories, as well as Australian rock art and linguistic features of  the many Aboriginal languages. The routes, dubbed "superhighways" by the authors, are similar to current highways and stock routes in Australia. Lynette Russell of Monash University sees the new model as a starting point for collaboration with Aboriginal people to help uncover their history. The new models suggest that the first people may have first landed in the Kimberley region in what is now Western Australia about 60,000 years ago, and had settled across the continent within 6,000 years.

Phylogenetic data suggests that an early Eastern Eurasian lineage trifurcated somewhere in eastern South Asia, and gave rise to the Australo-Papuans, the AASI, as well as East/Southeast Asians, although Australo-Papuans may have also received some gene flow from an earlier group (xOoA), around 2%, next to additional archaic admixture in the Sahul region. 

According to one study, Australo-Papuans (such as the indigenous people of New Guinea and Aboriginal Australians) could have either formed from a mixture between an East Eurasian lineage and lineage basal to West and East Asians, or as a sister lineage of East Asians with or without a minor basal OoA or xOoA contribution.

A Holocene hunter-gatherer sample (Leang_Panninge) from South Sulawesi was found to be genetically in between Basal-East-Asian and Australo-Papuans. The sample could be modeled as ~50% Papuan-related and ~50% Basal-East Asian-related (Andamanese Onge or Tianyuan). The authors concluded that Basal-East Asian ancestry was far more widespread and the peopling of Insular Southeast Asia and Oceania was more complex than previously anticipated.

It is unknown how many populations settled in Australia prior to European colonisation. Both "trihybrid" and single-origin hypotheses have received extensive discussion. Keith Windschuttle, known for his belief that Aboriginal pre-history has become politicised, argues that the assumption of a single origin is tied into ethnic solidarity, and multiple entry was suppressed because it could be used to justify white seizure of Aboriginal lands, but this hypothesis is not supported by scientific studies.

Changes c.4000 years ago 
Human genomic differences are being studied to find possible answers, but there is still insufficient evidence to distinguish a "wave invasion model" from a "single settlement" one.

A 2012 paper by Alan J. Redd et al. on the topic of migration from India around 4,000 years ago notes that the indicated influx period corresponds to the timing of various other changes, specifically mentioning "The divergence times reported here correspond with a series of changes in the Australian anthropological record between 5,000 years ago and 3,000 years ago, including the introduction of the dingo; the spread of the Australian Small Tool tradition; the appearance of plant-processing technologies, especially complex detoxification of cycads; and the expansion of the Pama-Nyungan language over seven-eighths of Australia". Although previously linked to the pariah dogs of India, recent testing of the mitochondrial DNA of dingoes shows a closer connection to the dogs of Eastern Asia and North America, suggesting an introduction as a result of the Austronesian expansion from Southern China to Timor over the last 5,000 years. A 2007 finding of kangaroo ticks on the pariah dogs of Thailand suggested that this genetic expansion may have been a two-way process.

The dingo reached Australia about 4,000 years ago, and around the same time there were changes in language, with the Pama-Nyungan language family spreading over most of the mainland, and stone tool technology, with the use of smaller tools. Human contact has thus been inferred, and genetic data of two kinds have been proposed to support a gene flow from India to Australia: firstly, signs of South Asian components in Aboriginal Australian genomes, reported on the basis of genome-wide SNP data; and secondly, the existence of a Y chromosome (male) lineage, designated haplogroup C∗, with the most recent common ancestor around 5,000 years ago. The first type of evidence comes from a 2013 study by the Max Planck Institute for Evolutionary Anthropology using large-scale genotyping data from a pool of Aboriginal Australians, New Guineans, island Southeast Asians and Indians. It found that the New Guinea and Mamanwa (Philippines area) groups diverged from the Aboriginal about 36,000 years ago (and supporting evidence that these populations are descended from migrants taking an early "southern route" out of Africa, before other groups in the area), and also that the Indian and Australian populations mixed well before European contact, with this gene flow occurring during the Holocene (4,230 years ago). The researchers had two theories for this: either some Indians had contact with people in Indonesia who eventually transferred those genes from India to Aboriginal Australians, or that a group of Indians migrated all the way from India to Australia and intermingled with the locals directly.

However, a 2016 study in Current Biology by Anders Bergström et al. excluded the Y chromosome as providing evidence for recent gene flow from India into Australia. The study authors sequenced 13 Aboriginal Australian Y chromosomes using recent advances in gene sequencing technology, investigating their divergence times from Y chromosomes in other continents, including comparing the haplogroup C chromosomes. The authors concluded that, although this does not disprove the presence of any Holocene gene flow or non-genetic influences from South Asia at that time, and the appearance of the dingo does provide strong evidence for external contacts, the evidence overall is consistent with a complete lack of gene flow, and points to indigenous origins for the technological and linguistic changes. Gene flow across the island-dotted -wide Torres Strait, is both geographically plausible and demonstrated by the data, although at this point it could not be determined from this study when within the last 10,000 years it may have occurred - newer analytical techniques have the potential to address such questions.

Advent of fire farming and megafauna extinctions 

Archaeological evidence from ash deposits in the Coral Sea indicates that fire was already a significant part of the Australian landscape over 100,000 years BP. Over the past 70,000 years it became more frequent with one explanation being the use by hunter-gatherers as a tool to drive game, to produce a green flush of new growth to attract animals, and to open up impenetrable forest. In The Biggest Estate on Earth: How Aborigines made Australia, Bill Gammage claims that dense forest became more open sclerophyll forest, open forest became grassland and fire-tolerant species became more predominant: in particular, eucalyptus, acacia, banksia, casuarina and grasses.

The changes to the fauna were even more dramatic: the megafauna, species significantly larger than humans, disappeared, and many of the smaller species disappeared too. All told, about 60 different vertebrates became extinct, including the genus Diprotodon (very large marsupial herbivores that looked rather like hippos), several large flightless birds, carnivorous kangaroos, Wonambi naracoortensis, a five-metre snake, a five-metre lizard and Meiolania.

The direct cause of the mass extinctions is uncertain: it may have been fire, hunting, climate change or a combination of all or any of these factors. The degree of human agency in these extinctions is still a matter of discussion. With no large herbivores to keep the understorey vegetation down and rapidly recycle soil nutrients with their dung, fuel build-up became more rapid and fires burned hotter, further changing the landscape. Against this theory is the evidence that in fact careful seasonal fires from Aboriginal land management practices reduced fuel loads, and prevented wildfires like those seen since European colonisation.

The period from 18,000 to 15,000 BP saw increased aridity of the continent with lower temperatures and less rainfall than currently prevails. Between 16,000 and 14,000 years BP the rate of sea level rise was most rapid rising about 15 metres in 300 years according to Peter D. Ward. At the end of the Pleistocene, roughly 13,000 years ago, the Torres Strait connection, the Bassian Plain between modern-day Victoria and Tasmania, and the link from Kangaroo Island began disappearing under the rising sea. Various Aboriginal groups seem to have preserved oral histories of the Flandrian sea level rise, in the Kimberley and Northern Australia and also in the isolation of Rottnest Island from the southwestern Western Australian coast 12,000 years ago. The finding of a chert deposit in the strait between the island and the mainland, and the use of chert as a predominant rock in the lithic industries of the region, enables the date to be fairly well established.

From that time on, the Aboriginal Tasmanians were geographically isolated. By 9,000 years BP small islands in Bass Strait, as well as Kangaroo Island were no longer inhabited.

Linguistic and genetic evidence shows that there has been long-term contact between Australians in the far north and the Austronesian people of modern-day New Guinea and the islands, but that this appears to have been mostly trade with a little intermarriage, as opposed to direct colonisation. Macassan praus are also recorded in the Aboriginal stories from Broome to the Gulf of Carpentaria, and there were some semi-permanent settlements established, and cases of Aboriginal settlers finding a home in Indonesia.

Culture and technology 
The last 5,000 years were characterised by a general amelioration of the climate and an increase in temperature and rainfall and the development of a sophisticated tribal social structure. The main items of trade were songs and dances, along with flint, precious stones, shells, seeds, spears, food items, etc.

Although it was traditionally thought that Australian Aboriginal people were exclusively hunter-gathers, as reported by Captain Cook, recent research strongly suggests that forms of taro ("yam") were planted and grown on land prepared for the purpose in some areas, and this may have been associated with more settled communities. Despite the presence of agriculture and permanent settlements, "Neolithic" is not usually used with reference to Australian prehistory.

The Pama–Nyungan language family, which extends from Cape York to the southwest, covered all of Australia except for the southeast and Arnhem Land. There was also a marked continuity of religious ideas and stories throughout the country, with some songlines crossing from one side of the continent to the other.

The initiation of young boys and girls into adult knowledge was marked by ceremony and feasting. Behaviour was governed by strict rules regarding responsibilities to and from uncles, aunts, brothers and sisters as well as in-laws. The kinship systems observed by many communities included a division into moieties, with restrictions on intermarrying dictated by the moiety an individual belonged to.

Describing prehistoric Aboriginal culture and society during her 1999 Boyer Lecture, Australian historian and anthropologist Inga Clendinnen explained:

"They [...] developed steepling thought-structures – intellectual edifices so comprehensive that every creature and plant had its place within it. They travelled light, but they were walking atlases, and walking encyclopedias of natural history. [...] Detailed observations of nature were elevated into drama by the development of multiple and multi-level narratives: narratives which made the intricate relationships between these observed phenomena memorable.

These dramatic narratives identified the recurrent and therefore the timeless and the significant within the fleeting and the idiosyncratic. They were also very human, charged with moral significance but with pathos, and with humour, too – after all, the Dreamtime creatures were not austere divinities, but fallible beings who happened to make the world and everything in it while going about their creaturely business. Traditional Aboriginal culture effortlessly fuses areas of understanding which Europeans 'naturally' keep separate: ecology, cosmology, theology, social morality, art, comedy, tragedy – the observed and the richly imagined fused into a seamless whole."

Political and religious power rested with community elders rather than hereditary chiefs. Disputes were settled communally in accordance with an elaborate system of tribal law. Vendettas and feuds were not uncommon, especially when laws and taboos were broken. Cremation of the dead was practised by 25,000 years ago, possibly before anywhere else on Earth, and early artwork in Koonalda Cave, Nullarbor Plain, has been dated back to 20,000 years ago.

It has been estimated that in 1788 there were approximately half a million Aboriginal Australian people, although other estimates have put the figure as high as a million or more. These populations formed hundreds of distinct cultural and language groups.

Little interest was shown by white settlers in the bulk of the Aboriginal people, and so little is known of their cultures and languages. Diseases decimated some Indigenous populations when they came into contact with the colonialists, and the Frontier Wars wiped out many more. When Cook first claimed New South Wales for Britain in 1770, the native population may have consisted of as many as 600 distinct tribes speaking 200–250 distinct languages and over 600 distinct dialects and sub-dialects.

Contact outside Australia 
Aboriginal people have no cultural memory of living anywhere outside Australia. Nevertheless, the people living along the northern coastline of Australia, in the Kimberley, Arnhem Land, Gulf of Carpentaria and Cape York had encounters with various visitors for many thousands of years. People and traded goods moved freely between Australia and New Guinea up to and even after the eventual flooding of the land bridge by rising sea levels, which was completed about 6,000 years ago.

However, trade and intercourse between the separated lands continued across the newly formed Torres Strait, whose 150 km-wide channel remained readily navigable with the chain of Torres Strait Islands and reefs affording intermediary stopping points. The islands were settled by different seafaring Melanesian cultures such as the Torres Strait Islanders over 2500 years ago, and cultural interactions continued via this route with the Aboriginal people of northeast Australia.

Indonesian "Bajau" fishermen from the Spice Islands (e.g. Banda) have fished off the coast of Australia for hundreds of years. Macassan traders from Sulawesi regularly visited the coast of northern Australia to fish for trepang, an edible sea cucumber to trade with the Chinese since at least the early 18th century.

There was a high degree of cultural exchange, evidenced in Aboriginal rock and bark paintings, the introduction of technologies such as dug-out canoes and items such as tobacco and tobacco pipes, Macassan words in Aboriginal languages (e.g. Balanda for white person), and descendants of Malay people in Australian Aboriginal communities and vice versa, as a result of intermarriage and migration.

The myths of the people of Arnhem Land have preserved accounts of the trepang-catching, rice-growing Baijini people, who, according to the myths, were in Australia in the earliest times, before the Macassans. The Baijini have been variously interpreted by modern researchers as a different group of presumably South East Asian people, such as Bajau visitors to Australia who may have visited Arnhem Land before the Macassans, as a mythological reflection of the experiences of some Yolŋu people who have travelled to Sulawesi with the Macassans and came back, or, in more fringe views, even as visitors from China.

Possible link to east Africa 
In 1944, a small number of copper coins with Arabic inscriptions were discovered on a beach in Jensen Bay on Marchinbar Island, part of the Wessel Islands of the Northern Territory. These coins were later identified as from the Kilwa Sultanate of east Africa. Only one such coin had ever previously been found outside east Africa (unearthed during an excavation in Oman). The inscriptions on the Jensen Bay coins identify a ruling Sultan of Kilwa, but it is unclear whether the ruler was from the 10th century or the 14th century. This discovery has been of interest to those historians who believe it likely that people made landfall in Australia or its offshore islands before the first generally accepted such discovery, by the Dutch sailor Willem Janszoon in 1606.

See also 
 Australian Aboriginal sacred site
 Australian archaeology
 Dreamtime, Aboriginal mythology about Australian prehistory
 European maritime exploration of Australia
 Juukan Gorge caves, destroyed in May 2020
 Lake Mungo remains
 Ten Canoes, a 2006 film about Australian prehistory

Notes

References

Bibliography

External links 
 Timeline of pre-contact Australia Australian Museum

Australian Aboriginal cultural history
Australia
Australia